Pyrrhobryum is a genus of mosses belonging to the family Rhizogoniaceae.

The species of this genus are found in Southern Hemisphere.

Species:
 Pyrrhobryum armatum (Sakurai) Manuel

References

Rhizogoniales
Moss genera